Taceno is a comune (municipality) in the Province of Lecco in the Italian region Lombardy, located about  north of Milan and about  north of Lecco.

Taceno borders the following municipalities: Casargo, Cortenova, Crandola Valsassina, Esino Lario, Margno, Parlasco, Vendrogno.

References

Cities and towns in Lombardy
Valsassina